La Strada (The Road) is a 1954 Italian drama film

La Strada may also refer to:

Stage works based on the film
La Strada (2017 stage adaptation), a play with music
La Strada (musical), a musical by Lionel Bart

In rock music
La Strada (band), a rock band
La strada (album), their album

Organisations
La Strada International Association, a non-governmental organisation network opposed to human trafficking